The Honda CBR600RR is a  sport bike made by Honda since 2003, part of the CBR series. The CBR600RR was marketed as Honda's top-of-the-line middleweight sport bike, succeeding the 2002 Supersport World Champion 2001–2006 CBR600F4i, which was then repositioned as the tamer, more street-oriented sport bike behind the technically more advanced and uncompromising race-replica CBR600RR. It carried the Supersport World Championship winning streak into 2003, and on through 2008, and won in 2010 and 2014.

Model history 

Honda's previous 600-class sport bike, the CBR600F4i, was considered a balance of practicality and performance, as capable as other Supersport-racing 600s, but a more docile and comfortable street bike relative to the competing Kawasaki Ninja ZX-6R, Suzuki GSX-R600, and Yamaha YZF-R6. When introduced in 1999, the CBR600F "fought off racier contenders on the track while still managing to be a more practical streetbike", as described by Motorcyclist, "one golf club that acts like a whole bag." With the successor 2003 CBR600RR, Honda shifted to a more aggressive, less compromising strategy in the "churning dogfight that was the middleweight class at the time", Honda's CBR-RR Project Leader Hiroyuki Ito said, "We developed the RR in a completely different way from any model in the past. In the past Honda has always developed a roadbike, then modified it for racing. But with the RR, we first built a prototype racer, then gave it to the production department." Rotating an aging model down to the next tier of a product line as it is overshadowed by a model with the latest technology is common practice among sport bike manufacturers including Buell, Ducati, Honda, Kawasaki, Suzuki, Triumph, and Yamaha.

2003–2004  
The 2003 CBR600RR was based on technologies used in the Honda RC211V MotoGP bike, and was given a similar appearance. It was the first Honda to use Unit Pro-Link rear suspension, a variant on the single rear shock absorber with the upper mount connected to the rear swingarm subframe to help isolate undesirable forces transmitted to the steering head. It also was the first to use Honda's Dual Stage Fuel Injection (PGM-DSFI): both were taken directly from the RC211V. Honda said that the use of its new 'Hollow Fine Die Cast' frame technology, in which sand casting molds were given a ceramic interior coating, made it possible to reduce the thickness of the five-piece aluminum frame from 3.5 mm to 2.5 mm.

The 2003 model carried over to 2004 technically unchanged, with only the addition of an oxygen sensor.

2005–2006 

In 2005, the CBR600RR received a major revision with new bodywork, fully adjustable inverted front forks, disc brakes with radial-mounted four-piston calipers, and a new aluminum frame, swingarm and rear shock. The midrange power was also increased. The 2006 model was unchanged from the 2005 model.

2007–2008  

On September 6, 2006, Honda revealed an all new CBR600RR for the 2007 model year.

Weight was the primary focus of the redesign.

In redesigning the CBR600RR for lighter weight and increased performance, Honda's engineers started with the engine. The completely new engine was smaller and lighter than its predecessor, the designers having used careful positioning of all internal components to achieve reductions in the motor's length, width, and height, as well as reducing weight by  compared to the 2006 model's powerplant. Horsepower increased to about  measured in independent tests.

The frame was lighter and more compact than the 2006 CBR600RR. The handling of the new bike was sharpened by its  shorter wheelbase, as well as by the designer's focus on strict mass centralization. Despite the shorter wheelbase, the 2007 model's swingarm was  longer than that of the 2006, made possible by the more compact dimensions of the new bike's engine.

The suspension of the 2007 model was carried over almost unchanged from the 2006 bike, with the same  inverted fork in front, and Honda's Unit Pro-Link rear suspension configuration damping the rear wheel. The new three-spoke cast aluminum wheels were also lighter than those on the 2006 bike, which further contributed to the enhanced performance of the suspension. The brakes had dual radial-mount four-piston calipers and twin  discs at the front, and a single-piston caliper and a  disc at the rear. Hidden below the steering head was an updated version of the Honda Electronic Steering Damper (HESD) system, which was also available on the CBR1000RR.

The smaller, sharper-edged new front upper fairing was dominated by the large central ram-air duct which fed the airbox through an opening in the steering head section of the frame and was separated from the sides of the fairing by a large gap which Honda said was for air management purposes. The tail-section was similarly smaller and sharper-edged, riding atop a heavily restyled under-seat muffler.

Combined ABS prototype 

On June 9, 2008, Honda revealed a CBR600RR prototype that had an all new braking system branded as Combined ABS which integrated combined braking, anti-lock braking, and brake-by-wire systems. Combined ABS used a computer control unit to ensure the correct balance of front and rear brake use and also controlled when the ABS should engage. The system was designed to be as unobtrusive as possible by delaying the engagement of the ABS until the last possible moment. Combined ABS was not made available on the production 2008 CBR600RR.

2009–2012 

On September 5, 2008, Honda introduced a revised CBR600RR for the 2009 model year. Combined ABS became available as an option under the model (CBR600RA). Other changes included updates to the engine such as changes to its pistons, cylinder head and exhaust that Honda claims will increase torque delivery between 8,000–12,000 rpm with a 3.5% increase in torque at 10,000 rpm. The CBR600RR's engine also received a new high resistance valve lifter and a popup valve system inherited from the CBR1000RR. It looks were the same as last year apart from some extra mouldings added to the fairing mid-sections that enhance stability and reduce noise emission levels by now totally enclosing the clutch and gearbox.  Although all of these changes involved the addition of some materials, the overall weight of the 2009 CBR600RR remained the same as the 2008 model. This was achieved through weight savings in the engine, exhaust, and the chassis.

The CBR600RR carried over for the 2010, 2011 and 2012 model years.

2013–2021 
The 2013 CBR600RR includes new 12-spoke wheels, revised ECU settings, and a fine-tuned ram-air system to increase torque. It also gets a new Showa "Big Piston Fork" and retuned rear shock in a new bodywork. The model continued unchanged through the 2017 model year. Motorcycle.com said that while the CBR600RR's performance specifications, particularly the horsepower, were "pretty tame even for the middleweight class", and it lacked the newest technologies like cornering ABS, traction control and mobile apps, it remained a comfortable and good handling sport bike for the street.

Motor Cycle News said a Japanese source at Honda said that CBR600RR sales in Europe and the UK will end after the 2016 model year due to the redesign costs necessary to comply with Euro4 emissions regulations, which will come into effect on January 1, 2017. Sales of CBR600RRs in other markets are unaffected.

2021–present 
The 2021 CBR600RR was released on 21 August 2020. Unlike previous models, it is sold only in Japan and Oceania. Updated equipment include a TFT instrument panel and reworked bodywork.

Market competition

2007
For the 2007 model year, the CBR600RR competed with the Ducati 749, a completely redesigned Kawasaki Ninja ZX-6R, Suzuki GSX-R600, Triumph Daytona 675, and Yamaha YZF-R6. Shootout comparisons by motorcycle magazines consistently awarded the CBR600RR first place in the super sport class. Major print and online publishers said the CBR600RR had a powerful engine and class-leading light weight.

2008
For the 2008 model year, the CBR600RR continued to compete with the Ninja ZX-6R, a revised GSX-R600, Daytona 675, and a R6. Even with no technical changes from the 2007 model, the CBR600RR continued to win middleweight shootouts at by Sport Rider, Motorcycle-USA, and Motorcycle.com.

Racing
, in the Supersport World Championship, the CBR600 won eight out of twelve titles since its introduction in 2003, and ten manufacturers' crowns since 2003. Michael Dunlop holds the supersport lap record at the Isle of Man TT on a CBR600RR.

Starting in the 2019 season, the Honda engines were replaced by a Triumph  straight-three engine.

Specifications

Awards
 2003 Best Sportbike, Motorcyclist
 2003 Machine of the Year, Motor Cycle News
 Machine of The Year 2007, Bike
 2007 Supersport Shootout Winner, Motorcycle-USA.com
 2007 Best Middleweight Sportbike, Motorcycle-USA.com
 2008 Middleweight Smackdown Winner, Sport Rider
 2008 Supersport Shootout Winner, Motorcycle-USA.com
 2008 Supersport Shootout Winner, Motorcycle.com
 2009 Best Sportsbike under 600cc: Honda CBR600RR C-ABS, Motor Cycle News

References

External links 

Honda CBR600RR reviews by Motor Cycle News

CBR600RR
Sport bikes
Motorcycles introduced in 2003